Presidential elections were held in Ivory Coast on 31 October 2020. Incumbent president Alassane Ouattara was re-elected with 95% of the vote amidst an opposition boycott.

Background 
In January 2017 incumbent President Alassane Ouattara of the Rally of Houphouëtists for Democracy and Peace (RHDP) announced that he would not run again after being president for two terms (2010–2015 and 2015–2020). On 5 March 2020, he publicly reiterated his intent not to be candidate during an address to Congress. Ouattara imposed Prime Minister Amadou Gon Coulibaly as the RHDP candidate of the ruling party over other potential candidates, including Vice President Daniel Kablan Duncan, who later resigned. However, in May Coulibaly was hospitalised for heart complications and had a stent fitted. He returned to Ivory Coast on 2 July, but died six days later after falling ill during a meeting of the Council of Ministers. The event left the RHDP without a candidate, and Ouattara considered putting forward Defense Minister Hamed Bakayoko, before renouncing due to alleged links to drug trafficking. In late July 2020, Ouattara rescinded his initial decision and announced his candidacy for a third term. The candidacy was made possible despite his previous terms as they did not count toward the two-term limit in the new constitution introduced in 2016, the elections having taken place under a different constitution.

Ouattara argued that because a new constitution was promulgated after a constitutional referendum in 2016, term limits (normally 2 for a President) were effectively reset, which would allow him to run for a controversial third term. Opposition parties argued that the move was unconstitutional, and some protests ensued, but Ouattara was allowed to run again regardless by the Independent Electoral Commission and the Constitutional Court. Despite seeing good economic growth, critics have argued that vast inequality remains, and that Ouattara is developing authoritarian tendencies. Despite opposition parties calling for a boycott, two of his opponents have allowed their names to remain on the ballot (Kouadio Konan Bertin did not support the boycott).

Electoral system
The President of Ivory Coast will be elected for a five-year term using the two-round system. If no candidate receives a majority of the vote, a second round will be held.

Candidates
Former Prime Minister Guillaume Soro, who was living in France, announced that he would contest the elections. However, on 29 April 2020 he was sentenced in absentia to 20 years in prison and given a $7.6 million (£6.1 million) fine. Soro's lawyers claimed this was an attempt to prevent him taking part in the election.

On 14 September, the Constitutional Council approved four candidates; Ouattara, former president Henri Konan Bédié from the PDCI, former prime minister Pascal Affi N'Guessan and Kouadio Konan Bertin, a dissident from the PDCI. Former president Laurent Gbagbo and former Prime Minister Guillaume Soro, both critics of incumbent Ouattara, were barred as they were facing criminal charges. The ruling led to violent protests.

Conduct 
The opposition announced that it would not recognise the validity of the election, saying it was "marred by many irregularities and a low turnout," and called for "the start of a civilian transition in order to create the conditions for a fair, transparent and inclusive election". However, several members of the opposition have had disagreements, with the PDCI, Guillaume Soro, Simone Gbagbo, and Pascal Affi N'Guessan saying that a transitional government should immediately be named, while the FPI party argued that it was too early to form one in the current environment, saying a civil disobedience movement needed to force Ouattara to negotiate in a legal manner. Several localities, including several in Yamoussoukro, had seen traffic prevented from reaching some neighborhoods, and that the entry points to the city were blocked by barricades. Election monitors from ECOWAS had to travel by helicopter to reach Abidjan due to difficulties entering the city. Opposition supporters attacked several motorcades of pro-government figures, in some cases shooting at them, or setting vehicles on fire. Several people were also killed in clashes in Toumodi, as well as Tiébissou. Indigo, an Ivorian NGO backed by the National Democratic Institute, estimated that 23% of polling stations were shuttered, and 6% had to close early before the counting process and announcement of results were completed.

Results

References

Ivory
Presidential election
Ivory
Presidential elections in Ivory Coast